The 1952 World Table Tennis Championships men's doubles was the 19th edition of the men's doubles championship.
Norikazu Fujii and Tadaki Hayashi won the title after defeating Richard Bergmann and Johnny Leach in the final by three sets to two.

Results

See also
List of World Table Tennis Championships medalists

References

-